Marie Troillet (born 24 March 1983) is a Swiss ski mountaineer.

Troillet was born in Bagnes. She started ski mountaineering in 2000 and has been member of the national team since 2004 as well as member of the  Dynafit-Team since 2005. Marie Troillet, who teaches in an elementary school, lives in Lourtier. Her brother Florent is also a competition ski mountaineer.

Selected results 
 2004:
 1st, World Championship single race ("juniors")
 3rd, Trophée des Gastlosen, together with Jeanine Bapst
 7th, World Championship vertical race ("seniors" ranking)
 9th, World Championship single race ("seniors" ranking)
 2005:
 1st, European Championship single race ("juniors")
 1st, Swiss Cup team (together with Laëtitia Currat)
 8th, World Championship single race ("seniors" ranking)
 9th, World Championship vertical race ("seniors" ranking)
 2006:
 1st, World Cup ("juniors")
 2nd, Trophée des Gastlosen, together with Andréa Zimmermann
 2007:
 6th, European Championship team race (together with Gabrielle Magnenat)
 9th, European Championship combination ranking
 2008:
 1st, World Championship relay race (together with  Gabrielle Magnenat, Nathalie Etzensperger and Séverine Pont-Combe)
 2010:
 2nd, World Championship relay race (together with Gabrielle Magnenat and Nathalie Etzensperger)
 2nd, World Championship team race (together with Nathalie Etzensperger)
 10th, World Championship single race
 2011:
 1st, World Championship team race (together with Nathalie Etzensperger)
 4th, World Championship single race
 10th, World Championship vertical, combined ranking
 2012:
 1st, European Championship team, together with Séverine Pont-Combe
 4th, European Championship single
 2nd, Patrouille de la Maya, together with Nathalie Etzensperger and Gabrielle Gachet, née Magnenat

Patrouille des Glaciers 

 2000: 1st, (short course) together with Stephanie May and Melanie Fellay
 2004: 1st, (short course) together with Laëtitia Currat and Annick Rey
 2006: 4th, together with Laëtitia Currat and Laëtitia Roux
 2008: 5th ("seniors I" class ranking), mixed team together with Sophie Dusautoir Bertrand and Rico Elmer
 2010: 1st, together with Nathalie Etzensperger and Émilie Gex-Fabry

Pierra Menta 

 2008: 8th, together with Laëtitia Currat
 2010: 4th, together with Gabrielle Magnenat
 2011: 3rd, together with Gabrielle Magnenat

References 

1983 births
Living people
Swiss female ski mountaineers
World ski mountaineering champions
People from Entremont district
People from Bagnes
Sportspeople from Valais